Suicide Bombing was a popular tactic of the Liberation Tigers of Tamil Eelam of attacking enemies to maximize enemy casualties and minimize attacker's casualties.

According to Jane's Information Group, between 1980 and 2000, the LTTE carried out 168 suicide attacks causing heavy damage to mainly military targets, but in some cases also to economic and civilian targets.

History

The first prominent suicide bombing by the LTTE occurred in 1987 when Captain Miller drove a truck laden with explosives into a Sri Lankan army camp killing 40 soldiers. He is heralded by the LTTE as the first Black Tiger.

By LTTE

The Sri Lankan economy and the Sri Lankan Army have been targeted on numerous occasions, including during a high-profile attack on Colombo's International Airport (Bandaranaike Airport attack) in 2001 that caused damage to several commercial airliners and military jets .

On 31 January 1996, the LTTE's Black Tigers carried out the Colombo Central Bank bombing that killed 100 people and injured 1400 others.

The LTTE was also responsible for a 1998 attack on the Buddhist shrine, and UNESCO World Heritage Site, Sri Dalada Maligawa in Kandy that killed 8 worshippers. The attack was symbolic in that the shrine, which houses a sacred tooth of the Buddha, is the holiest Buddhist shrine in Sri Lanka.

The LTTE's Black Tigers have carried out the assassination of Rajiv Gandhi, who was killed in 1991 using a prototype suicide vest, and Ranasinghe Premadasa, assassinated in 1993.

Easter Sunday bombings

On Easter Sunday (21 April) 2019, approximately 250 people died in six separate suicide bombings in churches and hotels. The local group National Thowheeth Jama'ath, was suspected.

List of suicide attacks

See also 
 List of massacres in Sri Lanka
 List of attacks attributed to the LTTE
 List of attacks attributed to Sri Lankan government forces
 Suicide in Sri Lanka
 List of people assassinated by the Liberation Tigers of Tamil Eelam

References

 
War crimes in Sri Lanka
Liberation Tigers of Tamil Eelam